The Liga ACB Presentation Games were exhibition matches at the start of a basketball season organised by the Spanish basketball league in the early 90s and they lasted for two seasons in 1990-91 and 1991-92. The games were both hosted in Palau Sant Jordi, in Barcelona, the home arena of Barcelona at the time. The main attraction of those exhibition games which could also be considered equivalent to the Spanish All-Star Game were the participations of NBA superstars: Michael Jordan in the 1990 edition and his teammate in the Chicago Bulls, Scottie Pippen and Philadelphia 76ers player Charles Barkley in the 1991 edition. David Robinson of San Antonio Spurs was also part of the 1991 edition but a hamstring injury kept him on the bench for the entire match.

Concept 
The game was a contest between the Orange (Narranja) and the Blues (Azul), teams which included the best players of the Liga ACB, a league considered the top in Europe, alongside the Italian. The NBA invitees would play for both teams, one half for each. Jordan had not won any NBA championship when he participated in the 1990 Liga ACB Presentation Game, but he would go on to win 6 rings in his career.

List of games
Bold: Team that won the game.

1990 ACB Presentation match
Palau Sant Jordi, att: 12,000, 30 August 1990: Team Azul - Team Orange 100-87.
Michael Jordan started with the Orange team and switched at the second half with the blue jersey. The end of the game found him on the winning side.

Rosters

Michael Jordan's statistics

1991 ACB Presentation match
Palau Sant Jordi, att: 12,500, 3 September August 1991: Team Azul - Team Orange 117-110 (ht: 51-57).
Pippen and Barkley started with the Orange team and closed the first half with a six point advantage for their team. They switched at the second half to the blue jersey and they finally won the game. David Robinson stayed on bench due to an injury.

Rosters

Pippen/Barkley's statistics

Players with most appearances

NBA/CBA Guest players

References

Basketball all-star games
Basketball in Spain